You Get What You Give may refer to:
"You Get What You Give" (song), a 1998 song by the New Radicals
You Get What You Give (album), a 2010 album by the Zac Brown Band